The 2019 European Individual Speedway Junior Championship (also known as the 2019 Speedway European Under 21 Championship) was the 22nd edition of the Championship.

The U21 final was staged at Rivne in the Ukraine and was won by Wiktor Lampart of Poland.

The U19 final was staged at Žarnovica in Slovakia and was won by Jan Kvěch of the Czech Republic.

Under 21

Final
 31 August 2019
  Rivne

Under 19
The final was staged at Žarnovica in Slovakia and was won by Jan Kvěch of the Czech Republic.

Final
 12 August 2019
  Žarnovica

See also 
 2019 Speedway European Championship

References

Individual Speedway Junior European Championship
2019 in speedway
International sports competitions hosted by Ukraine